Pardis Christine Sabeti (born December 25, 1975) is an Iranian-American computational biologist, medical geneticist and evolutionary geneticist. She developed a bioinformatic statistical method which identifies sections of the genome that have been subject to natural selection and an algorithm which explains the effects of genetics on the evolution of disease.

In 2014, Sabeti was part of a team led by Christian Happi, a Cameroonian geneticist, which used advanced genomic sequencing technology to identify a single point of infection from an animal reservoir to a human in the Ebola outbreak in West Africa. RNA changes suggests that the first human infection was followed by exclusive human to human transmissions. The work led her to be named one of Time Magazine's Persons of the Year in 2014 (Ebola Fighters), and one of the Time 100 most influential people in 2015.

Sabeti is a full professor in the Center for Systems Biology and Department of Organismic and Evolutionary Biology at Harvard University and on the faculty of the Center for Communicable Disease Dynamics at the Harvard T.H. Chan School of Public Health, and is an institute member at the Broad Institute and an investigator of the Howard Hughes Medical Institute. She is the head of the Sabeti Lab.

Sabeti is the lead singer and a writer for the rock band Thousand Days  and is also the current host of the educational series Against All Odds: Inside Statistics sponsored by Annenberg Learner. Her show is included in many high school statistics curriculums, including the Research Statistics 1 and 2 Course at Thomas Jefferson High School for Science and Technology.

Early life and education
Sabeti was born in 1975 in Tehran, Iran, to Nasrin and Parviz Sabeti. Her father came from a Baháʼí Faith family but never officially joined as a member and was the deputy in SAVAK, Iran's intelligence agency, and a high ranking security official in Shah's regime. She had a sister, Parisa, who was 2 years older. Growing up, Parisa taught Pardis the course material she had learned the year before in school, leading Pardis to be "almost two years ahead of her classmates" when the school year began.

Her family fled Iran in October 1978, shortly before the Iranian Revolution, when Sabeti was two years old, and found sanctuary in Florida. Growing up in Orlando, Sabeti wanted to be a flower-shop owner, novelist, or doctor. However, she was most passionate about math. Throughout her childhood and into college, Sabeti played competitive tennis. Sabeti went to Trinity Preparatory School in Central Florida. In high school, she was a National Merit Scholar and participated on USA Today’s All-USA High School Academic Team. She additionally attributes part of her inspiration towards medical science to the 1995 movie Outbreak.

Sabeti went on to study biology at the Massachusetts Institute of Technology (MIT) where she was a member of the varsity tennis team and class president, graduating in 1997 with a major in Biology and a "perfect 5.0 average." At MIT, she began her research career in David Bartel's laboratory and also worked in Eric Lander's laboratory, created the Freshman Leadership Program, and worked as a teaching assistant. She was then a Rhodes Scholar at New College, Oxford and completed her Doctorate in evolutionary genetics in 2002, and graduated summa cum laude with a Doctor of Medicine at Harvard Medical School in 2006, being the third woman to receive this honor since the school had begun accepting female students. The Paul & Daisy Soros Fellowships for New Americans supported her graduate studies. Initially, Sabeti planned to enter medicine and become a doctor; however, she decided to pursue research instead after completing medical school and discovering she preferred research to medicine.

Career and research
Sabeti is an annual participant in the Distinguished Lecture Series at the acclaimed Research Science Institute at MIT for high school students. In May 2015, she delivered a TED Talk, called "How we'll fight the next deadly virus."  "Her team was recently awarded funding from the TED Audacious Project to build Sentinel, a pandemic pre-emption and response system."

As a graduate student at Oxford and postdoctoral fellow with Eric Lander at the Broad Institute, Sabeti developed a family of statistical tests for positive selection that look for common genetic variants found on unusually long haplotypes. Her tests, extended haplotype homozygosity (EHH), the long-range haplotype (LRH) test, and cross population extended haplotype homozygosity (XP-EHH), are designed to detect advantageous mutations whose frequency in human populations has risen rapidly over the last 10,000 years. As a faculty member at Harvard, Sabeti and her group have developed a statistical test to pinpoint signals of selection, the Composite of Multiple Signals (CMS), and a family of statistical tests to detect and characterize correlations in datasets of any kind, maximal information non-parametic exploration (MINE). Sabeti created a series of videos with the goal of explaining statistics to high school and college students. Sabeti has via her collaboration with Michael Mitzenmacher an Erdős number of 3.

In February 2021 Sabeti co-authored a paper in Nature Communications on how a certain level of COVID-19 anti-bodies may provide lasting protection against the virus. The paper was based on blood samples provided voluntarily by 4300 employees of SpaceX crediting also its CEO Elon Musk.

In September 2021, Sabeti joined the YouTube channel Crash Course to host its series on Outbreak Science.

Awards and honors
Sabeti was the 2012 recipient of Smithsonian magazine's American Ingenuity Award in the Natural Sciences category.  In 2014, she received the Vilcek Prize for Creative Promise in Biomedical Science. She is a World Economic Forum Young Global Leader and a National Geographic Emerging Explorer.

In addition to being named one of Time Magazine's Persons of the Year in 2014 (Ebola Fighters), Sabeti was listed as one of Time Magazine's 100 most influential people in 2015.

In 2015, Sabeti was selected for the prestigious Howard Hughes Medical Institute Investigator award. She has also received a Burroughs Wellcome Fund Career Award in the Biomedical Sciences, a Packard Foundation award in Science and Engineering, and an NIH Director's New Innovator Award, and a L'Oréal for Women in Science Fellowship.

Sabeti was on the list of the BBC's 100 Women announced on 23 November 2020.

Personal life 
Sabeti is the lead singer and songwriter for the rock band Thousand Days. In her spare time, Sabeti enjoys playing volleyball and participates in Harvard's summer volleyball league.

On July 17, 2015, Sabeti suffered a near-fatal accident at a conference in Montana. She was a passenger in an ATV that went over a cliff, and catapulted onto boulders. She shattered her pelvis and knees, and sustained a brain injury. She completed rehab to return to teaching.

Filmography
 Against All Odds ... Host (32 episodes)

References

External links

 
"Profile: Pardis Sabeti" on NOVA: Science Now, 2008 June
Science meets MTV: Broad Institute geneticist and rock singer Pardis Sabeti merges lab culture with pop culture (Nature Network Boston, 2007 July 31)
Thousand Days Photos (2007 May 10)
Genetic Road Map Drawn for Tracing Route To Common Diseases
Video. Profile: Pardis Sabeti.  NOVA scienceNOW, 07.02.2008.
Burroughs Wellcome Fund Annual Report Profile 

1975 births
20th-century American people
20th-century Iranian people
21st-century American biologists
21st-century Iranian people
American people of Iranian descent
American Rhodes Scholars
BBC 100 Women
Evolutionary biologists
Harvard Medical School alumni
Harvard University faculty
Howard Hughes Medical Investigators
Iranian biologists
Iranian expatriate academics
Living people
Richard-Lounsbery Award laureates
Statistical geneticists
Systems biologists
Women evolutionary biologists
Trinity Preparatory School alumni